Shanono is a Local Government Area in Kano State, Nigeria. It is the headquarter of Shanono local government.

The origin of Shanono town, Shanono local government (town) could historically be traced back to renowned brothers Jaulere and Shanu''. These two brothers are to the land. Purposely for grazing and rearing of cattle, they were believed to come from the town of Hadejia in present Jigawa State. Having seeing that the land is fertile and good for their animals grazing the eldest settle in the place, for at least a year/season before they move forward, but upon observing the climatic conditions of the area which is suitable they decided to remain in the place and that was how some other people come to settle with them.

Upon finding the most suitable area SHANU decided to move back a little to present Shanono town and left Jaulere his brother in the place (present Jaulere) and come to establish his hirt (Riga) in Present Shanono town up to now the Rijiyar Taushe in Shanono Town is presently and physically seen. The following are the set of people that the Rulers who ruled the area to Resent time the title is Dan Shanono

Kabiru Isyaku (the present Dan Shanono time Dagaci of Shanono town).  Similarly we are having a district head (Hakımi) since Shanono become a local government are out of Gwarzo local government in 1989 his Name is Alhaji Bello Abubakar Title Bunun Kano, and Alh Ibrahim Sani Gaya Title Uban Doman Kano from 2004 to date,

It has an area of 697 km and a population of 140,607 at the 2006 census.

The postal code of the area is 704.
Prominent people of the town include Late Malam Ahmadu Idris Koya, Alhaji Idris Koya Director with the Department of State Service, Late Engr Mohammed BASHIR Ahmad Koya, Malam Mohammed Ahmad Shittu, Maj Gen Muhammed Sani Ahmed, Rear Admiral Abdullahi Ahmed, Col Yakubu Bako(Rtd), Alh Bello Koya, Late Alhaji Ibrahim aka Ibrahim (Businessman), Late Alhaji Barau (Businessman),Late Alhaji Haruna Muhammad Shanono, Late Alhaji Bawa Mashin (Farmer), Late Dan Ani (Politician), Late Alhaji Haruna Naganga(cocas chairman), Late Alhaji Shehu Shanono, Professor Nura Magaji, Sani Inusa Maijama'a, Abdul Jarimi Shanono (computer wizard) Shanono youth forum (Development organization) and many other well known personalities in Shanono.

Wards 
There are 10 wards in Shanono Local Government Area.

 Alajawa
 Dutsen-bakoshi
 Faruruwa
 Goron Dutse
 Kadamu
 Kokiya
 Leni
 Shakogi
 Shanono
 Tsaure

External links
 Shanono site

References

Local Government Areas in Kano State